Countess Amalia "Emilie" Wilhelmina von Königsmarck (20 August 1663 – 30 January 1740) was a Swedish noble, known as a dilettante artist (painter), amateur actor, and poet.

Life
She was born in Stade, the daughter of Count Kurt Christoph von Königsmarck (1634–1673) and Countess Maria Christina von Wrangel-Lindeberg (1638-1691), sister of Philip Christoph von Königsmarck, Aurora von Königsmarck and Karl Johann von Königsmarck, and a paternal niece of Otto Wilhelm von Königsmarck. She married count Carl Gustaf Lewenhaupt (1662–1703) in the presence of the royal family on 5 January 1689, and became the mother of Charles Emil Lewenhaupt.

Amalia Königsmarck belonged to the royal court-dilettantes among the students of Ehrenstrahl. Her known paintings include a self-portrait from 1688, a portrait of her sister Aurora, a portrait of the noble Katarina Ebba Horn from 1698 and a portrait of Sophia Dorothea of Hanover. 
She participated at the amateur theatre of the royal court encouraged by the queen, Ulrika Eleonora of Denmark. In the winter of 1683–84, a group of female courtiers performed the Swedish premier of Iphigénie by Racine at court. In the play, Johanna Eleonora De la Gardie acted in the part of Iphigenie, Amalia Königsmarck as Achilles, Aurora Königsmarck as Clitemnestre, Augusta Wrangel as Agamemnon, and Ebba Maria De la Gardie as Eriphile. This is regarded as a significant event as the first play performed by an all-female cast in Sweden, as an introduction of French Classicism in Sweden.  
Amalia Königsmarck also wrote poetry. Her poetry was published by Hanselli in the 19th century.

In 1695, she convinced her spouse to enlist in the service of Augustus II the Strong, who was at that time the lover of her sister Aurora. Because of this, her spouse was sentenced to confiscation of property and death in his absence by Charles XII of Sweden in 1703 during the Great Northern War.  The same year, however, her spouse died in their exile in Hamburg in Germany. Amalia Königsmarck returned to Sweden in 1722. Upon her return to Sweden, she brought with her the fortune teller Höffern.  She died in Övedskloster, aged 76.

References

Sources 

 Svenskt konstnärslexikon (Swedish Art dictionary) Allhems Förlag Malmö
 Lars Löfgren: Svensk teater (Swedish theatre) Natur & Kultur, Stockholm 2003, sid. 46. .
 Königsmarck, släkter, urn:sbl:11939, Svenskt biografiskt lexikon, hämtad 2015-01-21.
 Minnespenningar öfver enskilda svenska män och qvinnor

Further reading
 

1663 births
1740 deaths
17th-century Swedish painters
18th-century Swedish painters
18th-century Swedish women artists
17th-century women artists
17th-century Swedish actresses
Swedish stage actresses
Swedish poets
Swedish countesses
People of the Swedish Empire
Swedish people of German descent
Swedish women painters